Leonard Orchard (second ¼ 1912 – death unknown) was a Welsh professional rugby league footballer who played in the 1930s.

Background
Len Orchard's birth was registered in Newport, Wales.

International honours
Len Orchard won a cap for Wales while at Keighley, and scored a try in the 11-24 defeat by England at Anfield, Liverpool on Wednesday 10 April 1935.

References

1912 births
20th-century Welsh people
Keighley Cougars players
Place of death missing
Rugby league players from Newport, Wales
Rugby league wingers
Wales national rugby league team players
Welsh rugby league players
Year of death missing